Karel Kožíšek is a Czech sprint canoeist who competed in the late 1990s and early 2000s. He won five medals in the C-4 200 m event at the ICF Canoe Sprint World Championships with a gold (1998) and four silvers (1999, 2001, 2002, 2003).

References

Czech male canoeists
Living people
Year of birth missing (living people)
ICF Canoe Sprint World Championships medalists in Canadian